Mecopus may refer to either of two genera:
Mecopus (plant)
Mecopus (beetle)